Villedieu is the name of several communes in France:

 La Villedieu, Charente-Maritime, in the Charente-Maritime département
 La Villedieu, Creuse, in the Creuse département
 La Villedieu, Lozère, in the Lozère département
 La Villedieu-du-Clain, in the Vienne département
 La Villedieu-en-Fontenette, in the Haute-Saône département
 La Ville-Dieu-du-Temple, in the Tarn-et-Garonne département

See also
Villedieu (disambiguation)